Edge of Paradise is an American rock band that was formed in Los Angeles, California, United States, in 2011. The band currently consists of Margarita Monet (vocals/keys), Dave Bates (guitars), David Ruiz (guitars), Jamie Moreno (drums) and Kenny Lockwood (bass). The band is known for its heavy guitars complemented by industrial and classical influences, as well as Monet's large vocal range. In 2012, Monet was featured in Metalholic’s "Top 25 Women in Hard Rock and Metal."

History 
The band was formed in 2011 after Margarita Monet met guitarist Dave Bates on a freelance project. At the time, Bates was part of a band called "Bleed" with singer Robin McAuley, bassist Tony Franklin, and drummer Gregg Bissonette. Edge of Paradise reworked Bates' unreleased songs  and included them in the band's debut album.

The debut album, Mask, was released on September 15, 2011 by Melrose Music Studios. It features a rhythm section consisting of Gregg Bissonette on drums and Tony Franklin on bass.

Edge of Paradise's second album, Immortal Waltz, was released on May 22, 2015 via Pure Steel Records and Soulfood. The album was produced and mixed by Michael Wagener, the album cover art was created by Timo Wuerz, and the music videos for the singles "In a Dream" and "Rise for the Fallen" premiered via the magazine Revolver. The album was voted album of the week by Revolvers readers.

Edge of Paradise's third release, the EP Alive, was released March 10 via ILS/Universal. The six-song EP entered the Billboard charts upon its first week of release, on Billboards Current Hard Music Albums chart at #58 and Top New Album Artist chart at #94. The songs have more of an industrial feel to the music, using vocal effects, more rapid drum beats and more distortion to provide the album a different character than the symphonic-sounding Immortal Waltz.

Alive gained acclaim from music critics, who called the band a hard rock sensation. Bravewords.com described the EP as a "whole new world, another planet".

The single and title track "Alive" was released on February 3, followed by the music video which premiered on Metal Underground on February 10, and released on Vevo.

Alive was produced by Chuck Johnson, mixed by Jay Ruston, Mike Plotnikoff and Michael Wagener.

Edge of Paradise has been writing for a forthcoming album due for release in late 2019. The band announced their new album to be titled Universe, due for release on August 11, 2019.

Reception and popularity 
After the release of their first album, Edge of Paradise toured over 20 states, sharing the stage with Kamelot, Chris Broderick of Megadeth, Bullet Boys, Hellion, Helmet, Dave Lombardo of Slayer, and Michael Angelo Batio.

Metalholic stated, "Monet's voice is something that you don't expect, earth-shattering range, rich tone, pure power and strength. That girl can sing and she sings with her heart and soul, I think that's what literally hypnotizes people. There is something iconic about her. She can be idolized not only by generations that are into heavier music but also by the kids that are growing up on pop culture". Hard Rock Haven claimed, "The band can not only put on a show, but they are great songwriters as well. With their memorable hooks and huge choruses, listeners can hum their tunes long after hearing them play. There is no doubt in my mind that Edge of Paradise is on their way to the big stages; they are bound to break through."

Immortal Waltz received critical acclaim as well. The blog The Metal Pit stated, "Immortal Waltz by The Edge of Paradise is one of the most unique-sounding albums I’ve heard in a long, long time."

Members 
Current members
 Margarita Monet - vocals
 Dave Bates - lead guitar
 David Ruiz - rhythm guitar
 Kenny Lockwood - bass
 Jamie Moreno - drums

Former members
 Nick Ericson - bass
 John Chominsky - drums
 Kevin Katich - drums
 Gene McEwen - drums
 Kurt Schaeffer - bass
 Steven Cook - bass
 Vanya Kapetanovic - bass
 Jimmy Lee - drums
 Justin Blair - bass

Discography

Albums 
 Immortal Waltz (2015)
 Alive (2017)
 Universe (2019)
 The Unknown (2021)

EPs 
 Perfect Shade of Black (2013)
 Alive (2017)

Singles

Music Videos

References

Hard rock musical groups from California
American symphonic metal musical groups
Musical groups established in 2011
Frontiers Records artists
2011 establishments in California
Female-fronted musical groups